Men's Greco-Roman 75 kg competition at the 2015 European Games in Baku, Azerbaijan, took place on 14 June at the Heydar Aliyev Arena.

Schedule
All times are Azerbaijan Summer Time (UTC+05:00)

Results 
Legend
F — Won by fall
WO — Won by walkover

Final

Top half

Bottom half

Repechage

References

External links

Wrestling at the 2015 European Games